Chala Beyo Techo (born 18 January 1996) is an Ethiopian long-distance runner who specialises in the 3000 metres steeplechase. He was the gold medallist in the steeplechase at the 2016 African Championships in Athletics, becoming the first non-Kenyan to win that title since Brahim Boulami in 2002.

He made his international debut at the 2014 African Championships in Athletics, placing fourth behind a Kenyan trio. As a result he was chosen to represent Africa at the 2014 IAAF Continental Cup, held later at the same venue, and he again took fourth place. He placed fifth at the 2015 African Games.

International competitions

1Did not finish in the final

References

Living people
1996 births
Ethiopian male steeplechase runners
Athletes (track and field) at the 2015 African Games
Athletes (track and field) at the 2016 Summer Olympics
Olympic athletes of Ethiopia
African Games competitors for Ethiopia
21st-century Ethiopian people